Palayamkottai Central Prison is located in Palayamkottai Tirunelveli District, India. The prison was built during 1880 and was operating as a district jail until 1929. The jail was converted into a Borstal school in 1929, which was later transferred to Pudukottai due to lower admissions. It became a central prison starting from 1 April 1968.

External links 
Tamil Nadu Prison Department
TAMIL NADU PRISON DEPARTMENT Contact Details

Prisons in Tamil Nadu